The 2016 Cal Poly Mustangs football team represented California Polytechnic State University in the 2016 NCAA Division I FCS football season. The Mustangs were led by eighth-year head coach Tim Walsh and played their home games at Alex G. Spanos Stadium. They were members of the Big Sky Conference. They finished the season 7–5, 5–3 in Big Sky play to finish in a tie for fourth place. They received an at-large bid to the FCS Playoffs where they lost to San Diego in the first round.

Schedule

Game summaries

at Nevada

San Diego

at South Dakota State

Montana

at North Dakota

at Portland State

UC Davis

at Sacramento State

Eastern Washington

at Weber State

Northern Colorado

FCS Playoffs

First Round–San Diego

Ranking movements

References

Cal Poly
Cal Poly Mustangs football seasons
Cal Poly
Cal Poly Mustangs football